A digital matte artist, or digital matte painter (DMP), is today's modern form of a traditional matte painter in the entertainment industry. They digitally paint photo-realistic interior and exterior environments that could not have been otherwise created or visited.

The term 'digital' is used to distinguish a DMP from a traditional matte painter, although this is unnecessary, as the nature of a matte painter's work remains the same, regardless of the tools and techniques used. Craig Barron, the co-founder of Matte World Digital, offered an insight regarding the transition of the art from traditional to digital in the following words:It is difficult to categorize what a matte painting shot is today... Most filmmakers still call what we do matte shots, and we like that because we see our work as an extension of the original craft. But it's more accurate to say we are involved in environment creation.

From traditional to digital 
Traditional matte painting is older than the movie camera itself and has been already practiced in the early years of photography to create painted elements in photographs. With the advantages of the digital age, matte painters have slowly transitioned to a digital work environment, using pressure-sensitive pens and graphic tablets in conjunction with  painting software such as Adobe Photoshop. A digital matte painter is part of a visual effects team being involved in post-production, as opposed to a traditional matte painter, who was a special effects crew, often creating matte paintings on set to be used as backdrops. 

One particular drawback to the work of the digital matte artist is an occasional tendency of their output to look too realistic, which traditional artists avoided by using impressionistic elements or by suggesting details. What this means is that digital matte art is often characterized by an artificially perfect look. One of the modern approaches adopted to address this is the integration of details from a photograph, say, of real places to depict realistic scenes. It is this reason why some digital matte artists refer to their work as a combination of digital painting, photo manipulation, and 3D, for the purpose of creating virtual sets that are hard or impossible to find in the real world.

Workflow and skillset 
The time period and extent of involvement of a digital matte artist in film production varies by the type of film and by the artist's supervisor's (film producer, film director, art director) intentions. However, there are artists such as Mathieu Raynault who stated that they are often brought into the production at a very early stage, providing sketches and concepts to get a dialogue started with the director or art director. Raynault was involved on films like 300, Star Wars: Episode II Attack of the Clones, and two Lord of the Rings films, among others.

Because of the growing need for 'moving' mattes, camera projection mapping has been implemented into the matte painting timeline. Although ILM CG Supervisor Stefen Fangmeier came up with the idea of projecting Yusei Uesugi's aerial painting of Neverland onto a 3D mesh modeled by Geoff Campbell while working on the motion picture Hook in 1991, projection-mapping based 3D environment matte art was until recently, like its predecessor matte painting has been, the industry's best-kept secret. The involvement of 3D in this until then 2D art form was revealed by Craig Barron in 1998 after completing their work on the feature film Great Expectations when they introduced this technique as a 2.5D matte to the public. In production today this combination of 2D and 3D is part of every matte artist's bread and butter.

Because of their high artistic skills, digital matte artists are often also involved with the creation of concept artwork.

Notable digital matte painters 
 Michael Pangrazio
 Dylan Cole
 David Luong
 Milan Schere
 Max Dennison
 Jaime Jasso

See also 
 Matte painting
 Camera projection mapping

References

Books
 Barron, C., 1998. Matte Painting in the Digital Age. In: Invisible Effects. Siggraph 98: Proceedings of the 25th Annual Conference on Computer Graphics, July 23, 1998. Orlando, Florida, USA.
Cotta Vaz, M., 2002. The invisible Art: The Legends of Movie Matte Painting. San Francisco, CA, USA: Chronicle Books.
Rickitt, R., 2007. Special Effects: The History and Technique. London, UK: Billboard Books.
Uesugi, Y. et al., 2008. d'artiste Matte Painting 2. Adelaide, SA, AUS: Ballistic Publishing.

Matte artist